Prepusa is a genus of plants in the family Gentianaceae.  There are five known species, all endemic to mountains in Brazil.

It has been suggested that the name "prepusa" was derived from the Greek "πρεπουσα", which means "conspicuous", a references to the genus's unique flowers; another suggestion for its origin has been the Latin word "praeputium".

Species
Prepusa montana
Prepusa connata
Prepusa hookeriana
Prepusa alata
Prepusa viridiflora

References 

Gentianaceae
Gentianaceae genera